Mary Lou or Marylou may refer to:

People
 Mary Lou (name), including list of persons with this given name
 Mary Lou (actress), American actress Mary Lou Kolbenschlag (born 1992)

Films and television
 Mary Lou (1928 film), a German silent film
 Mary Lou (1948 film), an American film
 Mary Lou, the working title for the 2018 film Avengers: Infinity War
 Mary Lou 2, the working title for the 2019 film Avengers: Endgame

Music 
 "Mary Lou", a 1955 song by Young Jessie
 "Mary Lou", a song by Bruce Springsteen on his 1998 album Tracks
Marylou (album), an album by Swiss singer Anna Rossinelli
"Good Bye Mary Lou" a song by Angels of Light from their fifth record We Are Him
Hello Mary Lou, a song by Gene Pitney recorded by Johnny Duncan, Ricky Nelson and Gene Pitney himself.

See also
 "Hello Mary Lou", a song recorded in 1961 by Ricky Nelson
 Mary Louise (name), also Mary Louisa